Live at the Pearl, also known as Mariah Carey: Live in Las Vegas was a four-evening promotional concert residency by American singer-songwriter Mariah Carey. The concerts were showcased at the Pearl Concert Theater in Las Vegas.

Background
It was rumored in early July 2009 that Carey would perform a mini-residency at The Palms Resort & Casino in Las Vegas.

Carey announced the end of July on her official website that she was going to do four concerts at The Palms Resort & Casino in Las Vegas in the 2,500-seat Pearl Concert Theater.

Set list

 "Butterfly Overture / Daydream Interlude" (Intro)
 "Shake It Off"
 "Touch My Body"
 "Fly Like a Bird"
 "Make It Happen" (Performed by background dancers)
 "Angels Cry"
 "Always Be My Baby"
 "It's Like That" (With elements of "Hollis Crew" and "Sucker M.C.'s" by Run-DMC)
 "Subtle Invitation"
 "Rock With You" (Performed by Trey Lorenz followed by band introductions)
 "Honey"
 "Heartbreaker" (With elements from "Desert Storm Remix")
 "Close My Eyes"
 "My All"
 "Obsessed"
 "Up Out My Face"
 "I Want to Know What Love Is"
 "We Belong Together"
 "Hero"
 "Hero Reprise" (Outro)

Broadcasts and recordings

The September 11 and 12 concerts were filmed and later broadcast worldwide in over 200 countries and on 235 devices. A news report read: "Mariah Carey, one of the best selling recording and performing artists of our time will make history, Saturday, Oct. 10, when her performance “Mariah Carey Live In Las Vegas” becomes the first concert to be simulcast to mobile (internet enabled phones) and other digital devices worldwide". The digital version included 10 songs from the concert, and lasts approximately 45 minutes and was priced at $9.99. 

Steve Bartels, President/COO, Island Def Jam Music Group said of the event: "Fans from all over the world can now share the excitement of a live concert, wherever, whenever, and on whatever digital device they chose". For promotional use, one-minute clips of "Obsessed" and "I Want To Know What Love Is" were recorded at the September shows. A trailer was also created for promotional purposes for her Japanese fans. Ten of the songs from the show were released on a digital album in 2014, available on iTunes, called At the Pearl Palms Concert Theatre.

Shows

References

Concert residencies in the Las Vegas Valley
2009 concert residencies
Mariah Carey concert residencies
Palms Casino Resort